Soldier 2025 is a United States Army research and development project to create an advanced, high-tech combat uniform for U.S. infantry soldiers. The features of this outfit include nanotechnology, built-in sensors, and physical augmentations.

The ACU

Nanotechnology
Chameleonic camouflage - Technology embedded in the fabric of the uniform, most likely chemical receptors, would change color autonomously to blend in with the surrounding environment. This fabric is black when inactive.
Liquid armor - The fabric might also be treated with shear thickening fluid, a mix of polyethylene glycol and nanoscale glass particles. This mix would function like chainmail, flexible with low speed motion such as running, but hard and solid against high speed motion such as that of a bullet impact, preventing serious injury or death. The technology has already proven effective when combined with Kevlar armor.

Sensory equipment
Internal sensors - Thermal sensors monitoring both the environment and the soldier would automatically adjust the temperature of the uniform, keeping the wearer as comfortable as possible. Other sensors would detect injuries, the intake of harmful chemicals, and other physical harm, and built-in medical equipment would administer treatment as best able.
Situational awareness - A front-mounted video camera, vision aides (such as night vision sensors) and sound detectors providing three-dimensional audiological hearing would be embedded in the uniform's helmet. The face visor would act as a heads-up display, voice-activated to show ground maps, locations of fellow troops, and other needed information.
Communication - Real-time transmission would allow home base to see and hear everything the soldier does. This allows for provisions such as interlingual translation or sudden change of orders.

Augmentations
Internal respirator - A breathing device built into the helmet eliminates the need for gas masks.
XO Muscles - An exoskeletal structure on the legs permits the wearer to carry two to three times their body weight and feel only one time their body weight, increasing effective speed and endurance. No such enhancement is built into the arms or main body.

Projections
Soldier 2025 was showcased at the 24th Army Science Conference in 2004. While still in its conceptual phases, it was stated soldiers should be able to don combat uniforms similar to the showcased idea by the year 2025, as implied by the name of the project.

Possible termination
Some sources state that Soldier 2025 is part of the Land Warrior program, which was terminated in 2007, and this project was terminated along with it. However, the connection between the two is unclear at this time and requires confirmation.

See also
Army Combat Uniform
Battle Dress Uniform
Body armor
Future Soldier 2030 Initiative
Land Warrior
Shear Thickening Fluids
Supersoldier

References

External links
Military.com: SoldierTech
Docinthemachine.com: Army Axing High-Tech Soldier of Tomorrow

United States Army projects